Rettie is a surname. Notable people with the surname include:

Jodie Rettie (born 1990), Scottish rugby player
John Rettie (1925–2009), British newspaper journalist and broadcaster
Samuel Rettie (1818–1883), Canadian merchant, shipbuilder, and politician